Frances "Fanny" Coker aka Fumnanya (26 August 1767 – 12 April 1820) was enslaved on Nevis. She was a domestic servant who was the property and later servant to John and Jane Pinney of Nevis and Bristol. She moved to Bristol where the Pinneys lived at The Georgian House; at Racedown house at Broadwindsor in Dorset and at the lost building called "Somerton Erleigh" at Somerton in Somerset. She wrote home to her enslaved relatives and revisited Nevis.

Life 
Coker was born in 1767 on the island of Nevis. She was known as Frances and Fumnanya. She was born into slavery as her mother was a slave named Black/Igbo Polly (or Adaeze) and her father was said to be William Coker. Her mother had been brought to the island of Nevis from St Kitts by John Pinney who had purchased her together with eight other male children. 

The man believed to be her father was William Coker who was Pinney's plantation manager and he was married but not to her mother. Her mother worked in the Pinney's house and did some sewing, so Coker was brought up in that household. She was baptised when she was three and she was educated together with two of Pinney's children. Their teacher was Mary Keep whose husband was a mason.

She was unusually manumitted (freed) on 15 September 1778 by her owner. John Pinney freed slaves when they were old or sick but Coker's release was exceptional because she had been a valuable property. She was given a wage and she continued in service for the Pinney family in Nevis as Jane Pinney's maid. In 1783 the Pinney family set sail for England taking with them two servants. Coker was one and the other was Pero who was a male slave. Coker left her mother behind and her half sister, Hetty, and half brother Billy Jones. Billy Jones's father was said to be her boss John Pinney.

England 

Coker and the Pinney household stayed first in London before moving to her presumed father, William Coker's, home on Dorset called Woodcuts and then onto Bristol. In 1789 she joined Broadmead Baptist Church where she was re-baptised probably in August. Later that year Jane Pinney decided to revisit Nevis, but Coker refused to go with her. She agreed only after she was threatened with being dismissed.

In 1791 the household moved to their new home now known as the Georgian House, but then known as 7 Great George Street. John Pinney was keen to be seen as English and they also had homes called Racedown in Broadwindsor in Dorset and Somerton Erleigh at Somerton in Somerset.

Death and legacy
Coker died in England in 1820. She was buried in the Baptist burial ground in Bristol, but later moved (with many others) to Greenbank cemetery, Bristol.

In 2017, the Bristol Radical History Group created an event and video that was shot at Greenbank cemetery, Nevis and Nigeria to celebrate Fumnanya, her mother, Adaeze, and her grandmother, Ojiugo. She was played by Ros Martin.

References 

1767 births
1820 deaths
People from Nevis
Domestic workers